The Camp Sasardi salamander (Bolitoglossa cuna) is a species of salamander in the family Plethodontidae.
It is endemic to Panama.
Its natural habitat is subtropical or tropical moist lowland forests.
It is threatened by habitat loss.

References

Sources

Bolitoglossa
Endemic fauna of Panama
Taxonomy articles created by Polbot
Amphibians described in 1973